Vishwavidhaata is a 1997 Hindi film directed by Farogh Siddique starring Jackie Shroff, Ayesha Jhulka, Sharad Kapoor, Pooja Batra, Arjun and Ashish Vidyarthi. The film is shot in India and Sharjah. It is a loose remake of the Tamil film Pudhiya Mugam, written by Revathi and Suresh Menon. The film features songs composed by A. R. Rahman, re-used from Pudhiya Mugam. Rahman was upset with the producers since the music was re-used in the film without his permission.

Plot 
Jai Verma (Sharad Kapoor) lives in Bombay. He is an honest, unemployed youth who cannot arrange for his mother's treatment. He happens to meet underworld goons looking for such frustrated people, and they force him into the world of terrorism. Rai Bahadur (Ashish Vidyarthi), the uncrowned king of terrorism, orders Jai to be killed when he revolts. Jai flees to Sharjah and undergoes plastic surgery to begin a new life. He returns to India as Ajay Khanna (Jackie Shroff), meets his ex-lover Radha (Ayesha Jhulka), and marries her. They have a baby boy, Ravi Khanna (Sharad Kapoor). Ravi's parents want him to become a police officer to do away with traitors, but they themselves end up becoming a target instead.

Cast 
 Jackie Shroff as Ajay Khanna
 Ayesha Jhulka as Radha Khanna
 Sharad Kapoor as Jai Verma/Ravi Khanna
 Pooja Batra as Poonam
 Ashish Vidyarthi as Rai Bahadur
 Arjun as Goon
 Rakesh Bedi as Johnny
 Jatin Kanakia
 Shehzad Khan

Soundtrack 

The film features songs composed by A. R. Rahman, re-used from Pudhiya Mugam. Rahman was upset with the producers since the music was re-used in the film without his permission. The lyrics were written by P. K. Mishra and Mehboob for Humdum Pyaara Pyaara.

References

External links 

1997 films
1990s Hindi-language films
Films scored by A. R. Rahman
Hindi remakes of Tamil films
Body swapping in films
Films directed by Farogh Siddique